Bilsdean is a village between Thorntonloch and Cockburnspath on the East Lothian coast of Scotland.

See also
List of places in East Lothian

References

External links

SCRAN image: Road Bridge, Bilsdean
CANMORE/RCAHMS record of Bilsdean, Road Bridge
East Lothian At War: Invasion Defences
Geograph image: Natural arch near Bilsdean

Villages in East Lothian
Natural arches of Scotland